Christopher Robin Sabat is an American voice actor, voice director, ADR engineer, and line producer working for Funimation, and OkraTron 5000. Some of his prominent roles in animations and anime include Vegeta and Piccolo in Dragon Ball, Roronoa Zoro in One Piece, All Might in My Hero Academia and Daisuke Jigen in Lupin the Third.

Career
Sabat has provided voices for English-versions of Japanese anime and video games, including a variety of Dragon Ball characters, such as Vegeta, Piccolo, Yamcha, Shenron and others. Besides voicing in Dragon  Ball  he has  lent his voice to several other anime characters including Daisuke Jigen in Lupin the Third, Kazuma Kuwabara in Yu Yu Hakusho, Alex Louis Armstrong in Fullmetal Alchemist, Tatsumi Saiga in Speed Grapher, Kurogane in Tsubasa: Reservoir Chronicle, All Might in My Hero Academia, Roronoa Zoro in the Funimation dub of One Piece, Yami Sukehiro in Black Clover, Elfman Strauss in Fairy Tail, and Grip in Assassination Classroom. 

In video games, he voices Alex D in Deus Ex: Invisible War, Rundas in Metroid Prime 3: Corruption, Garland in Dissidia: Final Fantasy, Askal in Freedom Planet 2, and Captain Smiley and Star in Comic Jumper. He is also the founder and director of OkraTron 5000, an audio production company that provides support for some of Funimation's dubbing titles.

Filmography

Anime

Film

Animation

Video games

Live-action

References

External links
 
 
 
 
 Christopher R. Sabat at CrystalAcids the English Voice Actor & Production Staff Database
 

Living people
American male video game actors
American male voice actors
American voice directors
Crunchyroll Anime Awards winners
University of North Texas alumni
20th-century American male actors
21st-century American male actors
Funimation
Year of birth missing (living people)